HMS St David was a 54-gun fourth rate ship of the line of the English Royal Navy, launched in 1667 at Lydney.

She foundered in Portsmouth Harbour in 1689  and was raised in 1691 under the supervision of Edmund Dummer, Surveyor of the Navy.

The ship was later hulked and finally sold in 1713.

Notes

References

 

Ships of the line of the Royal Navy
1660s ships
Ships built in Lydney